Lucy Balian Rorke-Adams (born 1929) is an American pediatrician and the former president of medical staff of Children's Hospital of Philadelphia.

Early life 
Lucy Balian Rorke-Adams was born in St. Paul, Minnesota, in 1929. She was the fifth and last daughter of Armenian immigrants born in Turkey. Her father left Turkey for Minneapolis, Minnesota in 1913 on the advice of a German engineer who warned him that the Turkish government planned on exterminating the Armenians. Her mother's father was killed in the Armenian genocide, and she and her mother and four siblings were driven from their home and separated following this event. Her mother and three of her siblings survived and reconnected, and were able to emigrate to the United States in 1921 with tickets from her fiancée. The two were married on April 2, 1921, and their marriage lasted 54 years.

The Balian family resided in a rural part of St. Paul, and Rorke-Adams grew up surrounded by family: a total of eight of her cousins lived in close proximity to her home, and they spent ample time together as children. Rorke-Adams' first language was Armenian, and she entered kindergarten not being able to speak English. On top of not knowing the language, she had to walk three miles to grade school each day, and this distance increased to five miles once she reached high school.

Since there was not a large enough Armenian population in the Minneapolis-St. Paul area for an Armenian Orthodox Church to be established, the Balian family attended a local Baptist Church during Rorke-Adams' childhood. Rorke-Adams and her sisters were very involved in their church community as children: they attended weekly Sunday school, bible classes, sang in the choir, and participated in youth fellowship programs.

As a teenager, Rorke-Adams' dream was to be an opera singer. She eventually earned an audition with Gladys Swarthout, one of the major stars of the Metropolitan Opera Company at the time, but her audition was cancelled two days before it was scheduled to occur. Rorke-Adams was so devastated that she gave up pursuing a career in music entirely and turned her focus to medicine.

Education 
Rorke-Adams entered the University of Minnesota as an undergraduate psychology major in 1947. In the summer between her junior and senior undergraduate year, she spent time pursuing a research endeavor at the University of Innsbruck in Austria during which she learned German, which came in handy during her career. Rorke-Adams earned her BA in psychology in 1951, and she continued her education in psychology at Minnesota, going on to earn her masters in the subject in 1952.

Rorke-Adams relied on work to earn enough money to fund her education. As an undergraduate and graduate, to pay her tuition, she served as "girl friday" for a surgical supply salesman. After receiving her masters in psychology, she worked evenings in a psychology clinic doing psychological testing for the first two years of medical school. For her final two years of medical school, she worked a research job in University of Minnesota's department of psychiatry. Starting in her second year of medical school, she also had an externship at a local Minneapolis hospital.

In 1952, Rorke-Adams entered medical school at the University of Minnesota. She was one of five women in her class of 110 people, and all her professors were male. She entered medical school with the goal of becoming a psychiatrist, but her focus soon shifted to neurosurgery. During an interview with the chief of neurosurgery, Rorke-Adams was told that pursuing such a field as a woman would be pointless because neurosurgery is a referral type of specialty and nobody would refer any cases to a woman. However, this did not deter her.

Degrees 
 Bachelor of Arts in Psychology, 1951, College of Liberal Arts, University of Minnesota
 Master of Arts in Psychology, 1952, College of Liberal Arts, University of Minnesota
 Bachelor of Science in Medicine, 1955, Medical School, University of Minnesota
 Doctor of Medicine, 1957, Medical School, University of Minnesota

Medical career 
Rorke-Adams started her medical internship in 1957 when she was offered a highly coveted general rotating internship by Philadelphia General Hospital (PGH) on her match day. She was one of ten women out of 108 interns accepted that year. In the rotating system of this internship, Rorke-Adams spent a month in each rotation. Her first rotation was neurosurgery, followed by psychiatry, then pediatrics, anesthesia, obstetrics, tuberculosis service, surgery, gynecology, medicine, orthopedics, the diabetic ward, then finally outpatient. During her pediatric rotation, one of the eight interns working with her developed pneumonia secondary to an infection and died. During her internship year, Rorke-Adams and the other interns earned fifty-seven dollars a month (around $1.90 per day), which was one dollar more than the monthly income that would qualify a Philadelphian to apply for relief. Although she began her internship hoping to end up in a neurosurgery residency, she ended up applying for a residency in pathology, because she realized she did not function well without sleep and acknowledged that if she became a surgical resident, a lack of sleep would be a given.

During her pathology residency, Rorke-Adams was under the guidance of William Ehrich, the chief of pathology at PGH at the time. On her first day as a resident, Ehrich told her that as she was the only woman in her residency class and since "pediatrics is the province of ladies", she would be responsible for performing all of the pediatric autopsies. However, this responsibility ended up sparking an interest for the field of pediatrics in Rorke-Adams. During her time as a resident, she chose to specialize in neuropathology, and she began working under the guidance of Helena Riggs, who was a pioneer in the field at the time.

After completing her residency, Rorke-Adams was invited to stay at PGH in a dual role: Chief of Pediatric Pathology and Assistant Neuropathologist, a role that offered her the chance to spend more time working with Riggs. With funds from the NIH, the pair began a study on the myelination of the nervous system from the stage of viability to term. They investigated the development of myelin in 107 fetuses over a five-year period, culminating in the publishing of the atlas Myelination of the Infant Brain. Unfortunately, Riggs died one year before the atlas was published. Following the death of Riggs, Rorke-Adams assumed responsibility of neuropathology at PGH in 1968. In 1969, she became chairman of the department of pathology until the hospital closed in 1977. She also served as the first (and only) female president of the medical staff from 1973 until the hospital's closure.

Rorke-Adams began working part-time at the Children's Hospital of Philadelphia (CHOP), the nation's first hospital devoted to the care of children, in 1965. In the mid 1970s, after several years of holding a part-time position at CHOP, she became co-investigator on a massive study of pediatric brain tumors, where she looked at 3300 brain tumors over a four-year period. Based on her findings during this study, Rorke-Adams proposed reclassifications of embryonic pediatric brain tumors in a 1981 presidential address to the American Association of Neuropathologists, which led to improved treatment and outcomes for patients.

In 1972, the office of the medical examiner for the city of Philadelphia moved their location to PGH, bringing Rorke-Adams into close contact with forensic pathology for the first time. Following the closure of Philadelphia General Hospital, she began to work eight hours per day (full-time) at CHOP as a pediatric neuropathologist and four hours per day at the office of the medical examiner.

In 1986, Rorke-Adams became president of the medical staff at CHOP. Shortly after her appointment, she played a key role in helping run the hospital during an extended search for a CEO. She also went on to become the acting chair of pathology from 1995 to 2001.

During her time at CHOP, Rorke-Adams was the author of pioneering studies on the infant brain's normal and abnormal development, the effects of inadequate oxygenation during the perinatal period, and various nervous disorders unique to children. She also became an expert on shaken baby syndrome. In the 1990s, she presented a hypothesis on the origin of brain malformations arising in early human development: she proposed that disordered genetic control allows neurons to migrate to abnormal, disease-causing locations.

Rorke-Adams retired on June 19, 2015 after a 50-year long career at Children's Hospital of Philadelphia. Throughout her career, she has published over 300 peer-reviewed papers, multiple chapters in textbooks, and two books. She has served on the editorial board of the Journal of Neuropathy and Experimental Neurology, Brain Pathology, and Pediatric Neuroscience.

Awards and accolades 

 Elected president of the American Association of Neuropathy
 Received the AAN's Bronze plaque for Meritorious Contributions to advancement in neuropathy
 CHOP established a named faculty chair in pediatric neuropathology in her honor in 2010
 Received the outstanding achievement award from University of Minnesota's Medical School on November 1, 2017

Personal life 
Lucy Balian married Robert Rorke on June 4, 1960. The two met under a sprig of mistletoe on Christmas eve in 1959. Rorke provided ample support to his wife throughout her career. Rorke died in his sleep on Easter morning 2002, after the two had been married for nearly 42 years.

In 2004, Lucy Balian Rorke married Boyce Adams, who had been a close friend of hers for many years. Adams died of metastatic cancer two years and two months after they were married, leaving Rorke-Adams widowed for the second time.

References 

American pediatricians
1929 births
Living people
University of Michigan Medical School alumni